In enzymology, a pyridoxal kinase is an enzyme that catalyzes the chemical reaction

ATP + pyridoxal  ADP + pyridoxal 5'-phosphate

Thus, the two substrates of this enzyme are ATP and pyridoxal, whereas its two products are ADP and pyridoxal 5'-phosphate.

This enzyme belongs to the family of transferases, specifically those transferring phosphorus-containing groups (phosphotransferases) with an alcohol group as acceptor.  The systematic name of this enzyme class is ATP:pyridoxal 5'-phosphotransferase. Other names in common use include pyridoxal kinase (phosphorylating), pyridoxal 5-phosphate-kinase, pyridoxal phosphokinase, and pyridoxine kinase.  This enzyme participates in vitamin B6 metabolism.

Structural studies

References

 
 

EC 2.7.1
Enzymes of known structure